Heslington is a suburban village and civil parish within the City of York district, in the ceremonial county of North Yorkshire, England, south-east of the centre of York. Before 1974, it was a village in the Derwent Rural District, which was part of the East Riding of Yorkshire. From 1974 to 1996 it was part of the Selby district before becoming part of the new City of York unitary authority area.

History
It was probably an Anglian settlement and is mentioned in the Domesday Book. It became a Conservation Area in 1969.

Heslington Hall was built between 1565 and 1568 for Sir Thomas Eynns. In the 20th century it was owned by Richard de Yarburgh-Bateson, 6th Baron Deramore, and was used as the headquarters for the Royal Air Force's No. 4 (Bomber) Group from 1940–45.  It is now the administrative headquarters for the University of York.

Heslington hoard
The hoard of 2,800 Roman coins, known as the Heslington Hoard was found on 1 March 1966 during excavations in advance of the construction of 'College 3' on the campus of the University of York.

The modern village
According to the 2011 census the ward had a population of 4,792. The parish also includes the Badger Hill area.

The village tends to be busy, partly because its facilities are convenient for students and staff of the University of York; in the main village street these include a bank, two pubs, a post office, a unisex hair salon, and a grocery shop. Heslington Church is nearby.  The local school, Lord Deramore's Primary School, serves the residents of the nearby Badger Hill estate, Heslington village and the families of the scholars of the University of York.

The University of York started work on a second campus, named Heslington East in 2007, to the east of the village. There has been some controversy about the project as it was feared the village would be swamped by traffic and lose its status as a small suburban village. The planning application went to public enquiry and the project was approved by the Department of Communities and Local Government in May 2007. The new campus opened in October 2009.

Cricket
After 92 years of existence, Heslington Cricket Club folded in 2003 amid a certain amount of turmoil. This was not the end of cricket in the village however, as 2003 was also the year that York Civil Service Cricket Club lost their ground at Boroughbridge Road, York and were offered the opportunity to play at Heslington from the 2004 season. They have now rebranded as Heslington Cricket Club Heslington Cricket Club has since grown considerably, now fielding four Seniors teams as well as Juniors teams from Under 9s to Under 15s.

Gallery

See also
 Heslington Brain
 Heslington Cricket Club

References

External links 

 Heslington Village Website
 Lord Deramore's Primary School
 A detailed history of the village
 A Late Roman Well at Heslington East, York: ritual or routine practices?

Villages and areas in the City of York
Villages in North Yorkshire
Civil parishes in North Yorkshire